Cape Girardeau Court of Common Pleas is a historic courthouse located at Cape Girardeau, Missouri.  It was built in 1854 in the Federal style, and is a two-story, red brick building on a limestone foundation with a partial basement, hipped roof and cupola. Additions made in 1888, added Classical Revival style design elements including a pedimented portico. An addition was constructed in 1959.  Also on the property are the contributing concrete stairway (1900), a fountain (1911), a bandstand (1934) and a sundial (1938).

It was listed on the National Register of Historic Places in 2010.

References

Courthouses on the National Register of Historic Places in Missouri
Federal architecture in Missouri
Neoclassical architecture in Missouri
Government buildings completed in 1854
Buildings and structures in Cape Girardeau County, Missouri
National Register of Historic Places in Cape Girardeau County, Missouri
1854 establishments in Missouri